This is a list of people who were producers, directors, designers and other production staff on the Star Trek television series and films.

The Series column uses the following abbreviations:

TOS – The Original Series
PII – Phase II
TNG – The Next Generation
DS9 – Deep Space Nine
VOY – Voyager
ENT – Enterprise
DSC – Discovery
PIC – Picard
PRD – Prodigy
FILM – Films

Producers

Directors

Other staff

Films

Cast

Crew

See also
 List of Star Trek composers and music

Notes

References

·Star Trek
Star Trek
Star Trek
production staff